Sorry, I'm a Stranger Here Myself is a British sitcom that aired for two seasons from 15 June 1981 to 18 May 1982. It was co-created by actor David Firth and Shelley and It Takes a Worried Man creator Peter Tilbury. The first series was co-written by Firth and Tilbury, and the second one by Firth alone.

It starred Robin Bailey, David Hargreaves, veteran Anglo-Jordanian actor Nadim Sawalha (who had also guest starred in a few episodes of Shelley), Diana Rayworth and Christopher Fulford.

It was made by Thames Television for the ITV network.

Plot
The show revolved around librarian Henry Nunn (played by Bailey), who lived with his wife Sybil in Datchet, Berkshire. He is henpecked by his wife, who seems only interested in sitting in front of the TV, and whose face is never seen on screen, only being represented by a waving arm (belonging to Pamela Manson).

The frustrated Henry then receives on the day of his 60th birthday an inheritance from his late Uncle Crispin of a neat sum of money, and, even better, ownership of the house where he was born and spent his glorious youth, situated in Stackley, a fictitious Black Country town. So Henry quits his job and makes the move northwards.

Unfortunately for him, when he arrives at Stackley he will find himself immediately at odds with his neighbours: Tom (played by Hargreaves), a 'red under the bed' union shop steward and his wife Doreen (played by Rayworth); and Mumtaz (played by Sawalha), the Asian owner of the corner shop and who has a fondness for curry. Even worse, his house is squatted by Alex (played by Fulford), a green-haired punk.

The essence of the show was the lack of communication between the Henry and the other characters, and it was serialised, each episode following off from the previous one.

Episodes

Series One (1981)

1.1. Death of a Songbird (15 June 1981)
1.2. Arrival (22 June 1981)
1.3. All Friends (29 June 1981)
1.4. Haven't You Got Homes? (6 July 1981)
1.5. Small Hours (13 July 1981)
1.6. Never Look Back (20 July 1981)
1.7. Dress Optional (27 July 1981)

Series Two (1982)
2.1. Whither Henry (13 April 1982)
2.2. First Take Your Shepherd (20 April 1982)
2.3. A Cut Above the Restaurant (27 April 1982)
2.4. You Wash (4 May 1982)
2.5. Keep away from Children (11 May 1982)
2.6. The Camel's Back (18 May 1982)

DVD release
The complete series of Sorry, I'm a Stranger Here Myself, both series 1 and 2, was released by Network in the UK (DVD Region 2) on 11 March 2013.

References
Mark Lewisohn, BBC Online Comedy Guide/Radio Times Guide to TV Comedy
British TV Online Resources

External links
 

1981 British television series debuts
1982 British television series endings
1980s British sitcoms
ITV sitcoms
Television series by Fremantle (company)
Television shows produced by Thames Television
English-language television shows
Television shows shot at Teddington Studios